William Lyman (born May 20, 1948) is an American voice-over artist, actor, and musician. Being known for his polished, resonant voice, Lyman has narrated the PBS series Frontline since its second season in 1984 and played William Tell in the action/adventure television series Crossbow.

Early life and education
Lyman was born in Burlington, Vermont, the son of Mabry (née Remington), an editor and educator, and Edward Phelps Lyman, an educator.  He is a 1971 graduate of Boston University School of Fine and Applied Art. In the early 1970s, he worked for Allston Piano.

Career
Lyman was a first-chair bass player with a number of amateur and semi-professional symphonic and chamber orchestras."BIO: WILL LYMAN", whitethroat.com. Accessed July 10, 2020.

His film career began with a small part in the 1975 movie Jaws. In 1979 he played Ken Alexander in episodes of the daytime TV soap opera series Ryan's Hope and appeared in other daytime TV serials.

Lyman narrated the highly rated Vietnam: A Television History, a 13-part documentary series about the war that was produced by WGBH in Boston in 1983 and broadcast nationally by PBS.

In 1984, he became the exclusive narrator of PBS' long-running Frontline television series and is best known as such.

Since changing his focus to the theater, he has made a successful career in television, theater and film, including appearances in Hostile Takeover and Welcome to the Dollhouse, and as narrator of the 2006 film Little Children.  He has also appeared on the TV shows Commander in Chief, in which he portrayed the President of the United States (whose death in the story elevates Geena Davis' Mackenzie Allen to the office), and also appeared in TV shows Threat Matrix, The West Wing, and Law & Order.

Other of his voice-over credits include documentaries for National Geographic, The History Channel, The Discovery Channel and The Learning Channel, to name a few. Lyman has narrated many episodes of the WGBH-TV Nova series (including the Frontline partnership, What's Up With The Weather?).

He narrated a series of commercials for the Mexican beer Dos Equis, revolving around their character of "The Most Interesting Man in the World", portrayed onscreen by actor Jonathan Goldsmith.Robb, David, "It’s Official: Dos Equis’ “The Most Interesting Man In The World” Blasting Off To Make Way For New Guy", Deadline, March 9, 2016.

Lyman has also provided the voice for many commercials of the German automaker BMW. In addition, he was the award ceremony narrator in the 2008 movie Iron Man.

In the January 26th, 2014 episode of The Simpsons, "Specs and the City", Lyman spoofed his Frontline voiceovers.

In 2018, Lyman provided the narration for the documentary Trump's Showdown.

Lyman continued to be active and appear on stage at the Huntington Theatre Company in Boston, Massachusetts in Romeo and Juliet (2019), Guess Who's Coming to Dinner (2014), All My Sons (2010) and Dead End (2000)."ARTIST BIO: WILL LYMAN", Huntington Theatre Company, Boston, Massachusetts. Accessed July 10, 2020.

Since 2002, Lyman has been involved with the Commonwealth Shakespeare Company as Chairman of the Board (2002-2014) and as a member of the board of Trustees (2002-).

He had been a board member of the Screen Actors Guild for two years.

Personal life 
In 1972, Lyman married the former Anastasia Sylvester and they have one daughter, Georgia. They live in the greater Boston area.

Selected awards and honors 

 2013 Elliot Norton Prize for Sustained Excellence (The Boston Theater Critics Association)
 2015 NETC Award
 Howard Keel Award for service to the Screen Actors Guild
 IRNE Awards

References

Further reading 
 Abrams, Steven, "Talking with Local Actor Will Lyman", New England Film, October 1998. (Archived copy 1999)
 * "The Soup Cans Interview: Will Lyman", Soup Cans, Tuesday, October 7, 2008.

External links 
 
 www.whitethroat.com—Will Lyman's official website
 "Crossbow - William Tell fansite" with many pictures of Lyman

1948 births
American male film actors
American male voice actors
Boston University College of Fine Arts alumni
Living people
Male actors from Vermont
People from Burlington, Vermont
Frontline (American TV program)